Takakazu  (written: 隆一, 鷹一, 高数 or 孝和) is a masculine Japanese given name. Notable people with the name include:

, Japanese politician
, Japanese submarine commander
, Japanese noble
, Japanese mathematician and writer

Fictional characters
, a character in the manga series Kuso Miso Technique

Japanese masculine given names